New Buffalo may refer to:

Places in the United States
 New Buffalo, Michigan
 New Buffalo (Amtrak station), a train station in New Buffalo, Michigan
 New Buffalo Township, Michigan
 New Buffalo, Ohio, an unincorporated community
 New Buffalo, Pennsylvania
 New Buffalo Commune, northern Taos County, New Mexico, 

Other uses
 New Buffalo, former alias of musician Sally Seltmann, based in Melbourne, Australia
 New Buffalo (EP), an EP by New Buffalo